Sarare River is a river of Colombia. It is part of the Orinoco River watershed.

See also
List of rivers of Colombia

References
Rand McNally (1993) The New International Atlas.

Rivers of Colombia